Time Will Fuse Its Worth is the third full-length album by American sludge metal band Kylesa. It was released October 30, 2006 by Prosthetic Records.

Critical reception 

Critical reception for Time Will Fuse Its Worth was positive, with reviews rating it as significantly improved and more composed than previous albums. AllMusic approved of its "admirable experimental streak [...] in the near-psychedelic interludes" while Exclaim! approved of the melding of different influences with an array of vocals. Reviews were indifferent regarding the benefits of the new dual-drummer set-up, with reviewers noting that it rarely added anything extra to the songs.

Track listing

Personnel 
Phillip Cope – vocals, guitar, keyboards
Laura Pleasants – guitar, vocals
Corey Barhorst – bass, vocals, keyboards
Carl McGinley – drums
Jeff Porter – drums

Production
Produced by Phillip Cope
Engineered by Phillip Cope, Jay Matheson, Carl McGInley (also the assistant engineer) and Steve Slavich
Scott Hull – mastering

References 

2006 albums
Kylesa albums